Daniel Alan David Jones (born 12 March 1986) is an English singer-songwriter and musician who is one of the lead vocalists and the lead guitarist for pop-rock band McFly. Jones's fellow band members are Tom Fletcher (rhythm guitarist and vocals), Dougie Poynter (bass and vocals), and Harry Judd (drums).
Jones is married to former Miss England, Georgia Horsley.

McFly

McFly rose to fame in 2004, partly due to their association with Busted; McFly supported Busted on their A Present for Everyone Tour. Jones met Fletcher when he auditioned for the "boy band" V (he mistakenly perceived V as similar in style to the future Busted). Fletcher, who was filming the auditions for Island Records, later approached Jones. The two conversed and discovered common interests, leading to a songwriting session between Fletcher, Jones and Busted's James Bourne.

When they finished writing projects for Busted, Fletcher and Jones began writing for their own, then-unnamed band.  They temporarily moved into the InterContinental Hotel in London, United Kingdom (UK). Drummer Judd and bassist Poynter were subsequently recruited through an advertisement placed by Fletcher and Jones in NME magazine.

Jones, working with his fellow band members, has co-written all five of McFly's studio albums. He also penned three of his own solo tracks on the first three McFly albums. He has also produced tracks for McFly and other musicians; for example, he produced the song, "Only The Strong Survive", from McFly's fourth studio album "Radio:ACTIVE", as well as his band's cover of Rihanna's "Umbrella". Jones has also been listed as a producer for McFly's 6th studio album, which has still not been released but will soon be according to the band.  He has also produced countless demos for his band, alongside Fletcher. Jones also takes the role of lead guitarist in most performances, with Fletcher playing rhythm guitar.  He can be seen performing solos in songs such as "That Girl", "I Wanna Hold You", "Everybody Knows", and "Transylvania".

As a side project, Jones works on remixes for his band's songs, including "Party Girl" or "Nowhere Left to Run", and "Take Me There". Some remixes can be found as b-sides on singles released from the album Above the Noise.

Other work
Jones is a keen producer/DJ and footballer, as is McFly. He assisted Alan Shearer in a charity match in which England beat the rest of the world. After McFly's direction changed it was announced he would remix "Party Girl" as a b-side of the single after that he remixed "Nowhere Left to Run" for the "That's the Truth" single. After this success Jones played songs such as "Take Me There" or "End of the World" and "IF U C Kate" as well as his other remixes. Jones also works with DJ Roger Sanchez under the name 'The Saturn V'.  Jones has toured England as a DJ and is set to release songs called "Gone" and "Around Me" with Sanchez, also a remix of Rihanna's song "We Found Love". Jones produced a bonus track for One Direction on their second album Take Me Home and wrote "Don't Forget Where You Belong" from their third album Midnight Memories. In June 2021 he was in the starting XI for Old Habs as they won the Gareth Dineen Trophy.

Early and personal life
Jones was born and raised in Bolton, Greater Manchester, where his mother runs a hairdressing business. He was educated at Thornleigh Salesian College and, briefly, Haberdashers’ Boys’ School. He and his sister Vicky were interested in music from an early age. In 2014, Vicky took part in the third series of The Voice but was eliminated during the battle round. Jones attended Bury College where he studied for a BTEC National Diploma in music.

Jones is a fan of his hometown football club Bolton Wanderers.

Their father walked out on the family when Danny was eighteen and it left a lasting impression on him. Not long after, he co-wrote the song "Don't Know Why" (from Wonderland) with Vicky. The McFly song "The Ballad of Paul K", which he co-wrote with McFly bandmate Dougie Poynter, whose father also left home, was based on both their experiences. Jones has rarely spoken of his father and only briefly mentioned him in McFly's autobiography.

On 26 July 2013, Jones announced he was engaged to model and former Miss England, Georgia Horsley. They married on 2 August 2014 in Malton, North Yorkshire. They have a son, Cooper Alf Jones, who was born on 27 January 2018.

Filmography

TV appearances

Film appearances

Event appearances

Awards
(For awards won with McFly, see: McFly Awards)

2004
 Smash Hits Awards – "Most Fanciable Male"

2005
 Smash Hits Awards – "Most Snoggable Male"

Discography

Albums/EP's

Solo Singles

EP

In 2018 Jones Began Working On His Debut EP. He Began Teasing The EP's Lead Single Muddy Water, The Single Was Released On 7 June 2019. Bad Habits Was Released As The EP's Second Official Single On 14 June 2019. A Week Later, On 21 June 2019 He Released $igns As The Third Official Single. Talk in the Morning Was Released On 28 June As The EP's Fourth And Final Single. On 5 July Jones Released The Full EP, The EP Featured The Singles, Muddy Water, Bad Habits, $igns, Talk in the Morning And Also Featured A Cover Of Without Me By American Singer Halsey

References

External links

1986 births
British pop rock singers
Living people
McFly members
Musicians from the Metropolitan Borough of Bolton
Musicians from Manchester
Popstar to Operastar contestants
McBusted members